Louis of Opole (1450 – before 4 September 1476), was a Duke of Opole-Brzeg-Strzelce-Niemodlin during 1466–1476 (as co-ruler of his father) and briefly in 1476 (with his brothers as co-rulers).

He was the eldest son of Duke Nicholas I of Opole by his wife Agnes, daughter of Duke Louis II of Brzeg. He was named after his maternal grandfather.

Life
In 1466 Louis was named co-ruler of the Duchy of Opole by his father. One year later (in 1467), he took part in the Congress of Wrocław, where it was decided to declare the war to the king of Bohemia, George of Poděbrady, and Casimir Jagiełło was invited to take the Bohemian throne.

Louis died between 23 May and 4 September 1476. If he lived after 3 July 1476, he could have ruled the Duchy of Opole for a few months after the death of his father. It is unknown where he was buried, although it is assumed with a high degree of probability that it could have happened in the Franciscan church in Opole.

After he died unmarried and childless, his younger brothers Jan II the Good and Nicholas II assumed the government over Opole as co-rulers, but later in that year they decided to make the division of their domains.

References

Chronological Dates in Stoyan
Genealogy of Dukes of Opole

|-

|-

|-

1450 births
1476 deaths
Polish Roman Catholics
Piast dynasty
Dukes of Opole